The following is a glossary of diabetes which explains terms connected with diabetes.



A

B

C

D

E

F

G

H

I

J

K

L

M

N

O

P

R

S

T

U

V

X

References 

Diabetes
Diabetes
Wikipedia glossaries using description lists